A photofeed is a web feed that features image enclosures. They provide an easy, standard way to reference a list of images with title, date and description.

Photofeeds are RSS enclosures of image file formats, similar to podcasts (enclosures of audio file formats).

Feed format

A photofeed may be in the RSS 2.0 or Atom format.

Image format

Enclosed images may be in the JPEG, GIF or PNG formats.

Possibilities
A photofeed can contain:
 all pictures in an online album
 all images tagged with the keyword "sunset"
 an Amazon.com wishlist
 a list of houses for sale
 a list of desktop backgrounds (used by a screensaver)

Photofeed aggregators
A photofeed aggregator is a piece of software that accepts subscribable RSS 2.0 syndication feeds and downloads or precaches higher resolution images (rather than thumbnails) for later viewing, such as when offline. There are not a tremendous number of photo aggregators yet. (please add)
 iPhoto from Apple, Inc.
 Zencast Organizer from Creative
 Google Photo Screensaver (Windows XP and Vista). Available with Google Pack or Picasa.

See also 
 Photocast, a similar but incompatible implementation by Apple Computer

Web syndication